St Mary's Church, Llanrwst, was located in Betws Road, Llanrwst, Conwy, Wales. It had been built in 1841–42, and was designed by Henry Kennedy.

Intended for the use of English residents and visitors to the region, in 1874–75 the Lancaster architects Paley and Austin tripled the size of the chancel, extending it towards the east, and reseated the church at a cost of £925. This cost included stained glass by Ward and Hughes in two of the chancel windows. The church was later demolished and its stone altar moved into the north aisle of St Grwst's Church elsewhere in the town. Only fragments of the church walls have survived.

See also
List of ecclesiastical works by Paley and Austin

References

Paley and Austin buildings
Former churches in Wales

19th-century churches